The Grel Escape is a Big Finish Productions audio drama featuring Lisa Bowerman as Bernice Summerfield, a character from the spin-off media based on the long-running British science fiction television series Doctor Who.

Plot 
The fact-obsessed Grel chase Peter throughout time and space after he manages to use Bernice and Jason's Time Rings.

Cast
Bernice Summerfield - Lisa Bowerman
Jason Kane - Stephen Fewell
Joseph the Porter - Steven Wickham
Sophia - Julia Houghton
The Grel - Daniel Hogarth
Peter Summerfield - Dacey Warriner

Trivia
This story is a spoof of the Doctor Who adventure The Chase.

External links
Big Finish Productions - Professor Bernice Summerfield: The Grel Escape

Bernice Summerfield audio plays
Fiction set in 1900
Fiction set in 2022
Fiction set in the 27th century
Ancient Egypt in fiction